Carriage Museum may refer to:

Carriage Museum (Egypt), a museum in Cairo, Egypt
Geraz do Lima Carriage Museum, a museum in Geraz do Lima, Portugal
Remington Carriage Museum, a museum in Cardston, Alberta, Canada
Tofaş Museum of Cars and Anatolian Carriages, a museum in Bursa, Turkey

See also
:Category:Carriage museums